Wanda Jandar, Jandar (Pashto:جندر وانډه) is a village in Dera Ismail Khan, Khyber Pakhtunkhwa, Pakistan,  from Darra Pezu.

Nearby areas
Bahawal Khel, Kikri, Hori, Giloti and Wanda Chunda are some villages which lying around Wanda Jandar.

See also
 Wanda Chunda

References

Dera Ismail Khan District